Tutufa (Tutufa) bubo, common name the "giant frog snail" or "giant frog shell", is a species of extremely large sea snail, a marine gastropod mollusk in the family Bursidae, the frog shells.

Description
The solid shell is large. The sculpture is coarse. The length of an adult shell varies between 100 mm and 337 mm.

Distribution
This frog shell is found in the tropics from low water to depths up to 180 m, mainly among rocks and coral. It occurs in the Red Sea, off the Philippines and in the Indo-Pacific Oceans.

References

 Vine, P. (1986). Red Sea Invertebrates. Immel Publishing, London. 224 pp.
 Steyn, D.G. & Lussi, M. (1998) Marine Shells of South Africa. An Illustrated Collector’s Guide to Beached Shells. Ekogilde Publishers, Hartebeespoort, South Africa, ii + 264 pp. page(s): 72
  Steyn, D. G.; Lussi, M. (2005). Offshore Shells of Southern Africa: A pictorial guide to more than 750 Gastropods. Published by the authors. pp. i–vi, 1–289.

External links

 Linnaeus, C. (1758). Systema Naturae per regna tria naturae, secundum classes, ordines, genera, species, cum characteribus, differentiis, synonymis, locis. Editio decima, reformata [10th revised edition, vol. 1: 824 pp. Laurentius Salvius: Holmiae.]
 

Bursidae
Gastropods described in 1758
Taxa named by Carl Linnaeus